Panagiota Riga (born 8 February 1988) is a Cypriot footballer who plays for First Division club AC Omonia. She has been a member of the Cyprus women's national team.

International career
Riga capped for Cyprus at senior level during the 2017 Aphrodite Cup, including a 1–2 loss to Latvia on 12 March 2017.

References

1988 births
Living people
Cypriot women's footballers
Cyprus women's international footballers
AC Omonia players
Women's association footballers not categorized by position